Valley of Fear is a 1947 American Western film directed by Lambert Hillyer and written by J. Benton Cheney. The film stars Johnny Mack Brown, Raymond Hatton, Christine McIntyre, Tris Coffin, Ed Cassidy and Eddie Parker. The film was released on February 15, 1947, by Monogram Pictures.

Plot

Cast            
Johnny Mack Brown as Johnny Williams
Raymond Hatton as Rusty Peters
Christine McIntyre as Joan Travers
Tris Coffin as Henry Stevens
Ed Cassidy as Les Travers 
Eddie Parker as Duke 
Edward Peil Sr. as Jamison Forbes
Ted Adams as Frank Wilkins
Pierce Lyden as Sheriff Wheeler
Steve Darrell as Tom Lansing
Cactus Mack as Spence Mallory
Budd Buster as Pete the Bootmaker

References

External links
 

1947 films
American Western (genre) films
1947 Western (genre) films
Monogram Pictures films
Films directed by Lambert Hillyer
American black-and-white films
1940s English-language films
1940s American films